Edwalton is an area of West Bridgford in the Borough of Rushcliffe, in Nottinghamshire, England, covering Gamston and the older Edwalton village. The population of the Rushcliffe Ward was 3,908 at the 2011 Census. A 2019 estimate put it at 4,892.

History
One of the earliest mentions of Edwalton village is in the Domesday book where it features among lands given to Hugh de Grandmesnil by King William 1.

After the marriage of the heir to West Bridgford's landowners, the Musters family, into the Chaworth family, the areas of West Bridgford and Edwalton were joined as West Bridgford Urban District and now as part of Rushcliffe Borough.

Notable people
Arthur Richardson (1860–1936), a Nottinghamshire tea merchant, elected several times as a Liberal or Labour Member of Parliament, died in Edwalton.
Thomas Collins (1895–1964), a county cricketer for Nottinghamshire and Hampshire, died in Edwalton in 1964.

Property

While the official boundaries of Edwalton are uncertain, Boundary Road is commonly accepted as the division from West Bridgford.

Edwalton contains some of Nottingham's most expensive properties: Valley Road, Melton Road, Croft Road and Village Street include properties worth over a million pounds. Edwalton Hall, the largest, was once the residence of the Chaworth family and is now an exclusive complex of mews houses and apartments. For a time it became a hotel and restaurant, before being developed by Crosby Homes. Today it includes a gym, swimming pool and croquet lawn. In recent years developers have laid out new housing estates in the area known locally as Sharphill Farm. These are primarily of high-specification family homes, with good road links for commuters.

Edwalton is varied architecturally. Landmark bespoke houses are common, but most of it is now composed of large housing estates, first built in the early 1950s, with subsequent estates added in the 1980s to the present day. Many council houses and flats were privately bought under the Right to buy scheme of the 1980s. Only a small number now belong to Rushcliffe Borough Council. Its housing stock passed in early 2003 to Spirita Housing Association. On 1 April 2012 Spirita was dissolved and ownership was taken over by Metropolitan Housing Association Group, based in London.

Plans to provide Edwalton with a parish council were rejected after a two-stage consultation process, culminating in a report issued in February 2014 by Rushcliffe Borough Council.

Facilities
Edwalton has a state primary school and a golf course. There is also a general store, post office, newsagent, café, hair salon, pharmacy and a dog groomer within the main shopping area of Earlswood Drive.

The Anglican Church of the Holy Rood, Edwalton has its own page. Edwalton Community Church in Wellin Lane offers community services such as a pre-school, a toddlers group, a ladies' fellowship group and children's activities, and a "Blessings in a Box" scheme for the financially challenged.

Bus transport
Nottingham City Transport
 6: Nottingham – West Bridgford – Edwalton
Trentbarton
 'The Keyworth': Nottingham Broadmarsh – West Bridgford – Edwalton – Tollerton – Plumtree – Keyworth

References

External links
Churches:
Edwalton Community Church
Holy Rood church

Schools:
Edwalton Primary School

Amenities:
Golf Course

Villages in Nottinghamshire
Rushcliffe